Darius Vito Victor (born March 6, 1994) is a Liberian professional gridiron football running back for the New Jersey Generals of the United States Football League (USFL). He played college football at Towson University. Victor was named 2022 Offensive Player of the Year of the United States Football League as a member of the New Jersey Generals.

Early years
Victor was born to Liberian parents as one of seven children in a refugee camp in the Ivory Coast after the parents fled the First Liberian Civil War. He lived there until 1999, when his family came to the United States.

High school career
Victor attended Northwestern High School in Hyattsville, Maryland. As a senior, Victor was the leading rusher in the state of Maryland with 2,107 yards and 31 touchdowns. His efforts would be rewarded with all-state honors. During his time at Northwestern, Victor also played basketball and ran track. Despite his success in high school Victor was only ranked a 2-star recruit (73) by 247Sports.

College career
Victor attended Towson University in Towson, Maryland. As a true freshman in 2013, Victor found success as the backup to record-breaking running back Terrance West. He made his debut at North Carolina Central and ran for 53 yards and two touchdowns on six carries. Victor would go on to appear in 14 games his first year, amassing 629 yards and seven touchdowns on 98 carries. Following the season, he would be named the CAA Offensive Rookie of the Year.

The 2014 season would be another successful one for Victor. With Terrance West departing for the NFL, Victor saw his workload increase. Despite the Tigers' rough 4-8 season, he was able to gain 1,305 yards and 12 touchdowns on 250 carries. Victor averaged 108.8 yards a game and scored a touchdown in 9 of the team's 12 games. He finished his college career with more than 3,300 yards and 41 touchdowns.

Throughout his career at Towson, Johnny Unitas Stadium played part of his brother's song about him each time he got a carry called "VITO".

Professional career

New Orleans Saints
Victor declared for the 2017 NFL Draft, however he was not drafted. He was invited to the New York Jets training camp, however a week later he attended the New Orleans Saints rookie minicamp. On August 1, 2017, Victor signed with the Saints. He was waived on September 2, 2017.

Arizona Cardinals
On November 29, 2017, Victor was signed to the Arizona Cardinals' practice squad. He signed a reserve/future contract with the Cardinals on January 2, 2018.

On May 1, 2018, Victor was waived by the Cardinals. He was re-signed on August 28, 2018. He was waived on September 1, 2018.

New York Guardians
In October 2019, Victor was selected by the New York Guardians in the 2020 XFL Draft. He had his contract terminated when the league suspended operations on April 10, 2020.

New Jersey Generals
Victor was drafted by the New Jersey Generals of the United States Football League. He was named to the All-USFL team following the season and would be named the 2022 United States Football League Offensive Player of the Year after leading the league with nine touchdown runs.

On July 19, 2022, Victor worked out with the New Orleans Saints, but no deal was reached.

References

1994 births
Arizona Cardinals players
Living people
Liberian players of American football
New Orleans Saints players
New York Guardians players
Players of American football from Baltimore
Towson Tigers football players
New Jersey Generals (2022) players